The 1994 UCLA Bruins football team represented the University of California, Los Angeles in the 1994 NCAA Division I-A football season. The Bruins began the season ranked No. 14. By the end of the season, the team tied for fifth place in the Pacific-10 Conference.

Schedule

Roster

Awards and honors
 All-Americans: Kevin Jordan (FL), Donnie Edwards (OLB, second team), Darren Schager (P, second team)
 All-Conference First Team: Donnie Edwards (LB), Mike Flanagan (C), Jonathan Ogden (OT), Darren Schager (P)

References

UCLA
UCLA Bruins football seasons
UCLA Bruins football